Union du Football Mâconnais is a football club located in Mâcon, France. They play in Championnat National 3, the fifth tier of French football. The club's president is Alain Griezmann, the father of professional footballer Antoine Griezmann. Mâcon's club colour is marine blue.

History 
Founded in 1997, UF Mâconnais came to be firstly from the merger of Union Sportive de Charnay and ASPTT Mâcon, and secondly from the merger of the newly-created Entente Charnay et Mâcon 71 and Football Club Mâcon. Initially called Mâconnais Football Club, it was renamed to Union du Football Mâconnais in 2000.

Youth development is an important aspect of UF Mâconnais. The U17 team of the club formerly competed in the Championnat National U17 from 2010 to 2015.

The highest tier the club has played in during its history is the Championnat National 3, the fifth tier in the French football league system. In the 2020–21 season, Mâcon reached the round of 64 of the Coupe de France, the furthest they had ever progressed in the competition.

Managerial history 
 1997–2001:  Christian Romond
 2001–2002:  Diego Garzitto
 2002–2006:  
 2006–2008:  Joël Greuzet
 2008–2009:  Unknown
 2009–2012:  
 2012–2013:  Thierry Droin
 2013–2015:  Denis Promonet
 2015–2017:  Frédéric Jay
 2017–2020:  
 2020–present:  Romain Paturel

Presidential history 

 1997–1999:  Pierre Augagneur
 1999–2000:  Maurice Portrait
 2000–2002:  Alain Rigaudier
 2002–2011:  Serge Rivéra
 2011–2013:  Denis Jacquet
 2013–2016:  Manuel Goncalvès
 2016–2020:  Stéphane Margand
 2020–present:  Alain Griezmann

Players

Current squad

Notable former players 
  Antoine Griezmann
  Junior Sambia

Honours

References

External links 
 Club website

Association football clubs established in 1999
1999 establishments in France
Sport in Saône-et-Loire
 
Football clubs in Bourgogne-Franche-Comté